Sijua jejunalis is a species of moth of the family Thyrididae. It is found in the small African nation of Togo.

The wingspan of this species is 19–20 mm.

References

Thyrididae
Moths described in 1917